Jai Quitongo (born 14 September 1997) is a Scottish professional footballer who plays as a winger for Greenock Morton.

He has previously played for Morton, Partick Thistle, Machine Sazi, Dumbarton and Queen's Park. Throughout his youth career, Quitongo played for Hamilton Academical and Aberdeen.

Quitongo is a one-time capped Scotland U21 internationalist.

Background
Quitongo's father is ex-Hamilton Academical, Heart of Midlothian and St Mirren winger José Quitongo. His brother, Rico, plays as a left back for Scottish League One club Queen of the South.

Club career

Greenock Morton
After playing for the youth sides at Hamilton Academical and Aberdeen, Quitongo signed for Greenock Morton on a short-term deal in August 2015. He was offered an 18-month extension in December 2015 and made his debut for the first team as a late substitute against Raith Rovers.

In December 2015, Quitongo signed a contract extension, making him contracted to the club until May 2017. His first goal for the club came against Kilmarnock in the League Cup and followed up with a winning strike against Hamilton Academical.

On 31 August 2016, Morton rejected a bid from Doncaster Rovers for Quitongo's services. Quitongo underwent knee surgery in January 2017. While recovering from the injury, he signed a new contract with Morton that ran until June 2018. He was offered a new one-year deal but this was rescinded in August 2018 and he was released from the club.

Partick Thistle
After agreeing compensation, due to his age, Quitongo joined Partick Thistle on a short-term deal until January 2019. Jai scored his first goal for the Jags in a 2-1 home defeat against Dundee United.

Machine Sazi
After leaving Thistle, in March 2019, Quitongo moved to Iranian side Machine Sazi on a four-year deal.

Dumbarton 
He left Machine after just eight appearances and joined Scottish League One club Dumbarton on a short-term deal in January 2020, teaming up with his younger brother Rico and former manager at Greenock Morton Jim Duffy. He scored his first goal for the club against Forfar Athletic in March 2020. He left the club in July 2020 after six appearances and one goal.

Queen's Park 
Quitongo signed for League Two club Queen's Park in October 2020.

Greenock Morton 
On 20th July 2022, Quitongo would return to his first club, Greenock Morton, signing a 1 year contract until the end of the season. He scored his first goal of the season in a 1-0 home win against Cove Rangers, and scored later on in the season in a 1-1 draw with Ayr United.

International career
On 31 October 2016, Quitongo was selected by coach Scot Gemmill for the Scotland under-21 squad. He debuted as a substitute in a friendly defeat away to Slovakia.

Career statistics

Honours
Morton
SPFL Development League West: Winners 2015–16

References

External links

1997 births
Living people
Sportspeople from Wishaw
Greenock Morton F.C. players
Aberdeen F.C. players
Association football wingers
Scottish footballers
Hamilton Academical F.C. players
Scottish Professional Football League players
Black British sportsmen
Scottish people of Angolan descent
Scotland under-21 international footballers
Partick Thistle F.C. players
Scottish expatriate footballers
Expatriate footballers in Iran
Machine Sazi F.C. players
Persian Gulf Pro League players
Dumbarton F.C. players
Queen's Park F.C. players
Sportspeople of Angolan descent
Footballers from North Lanarkshire
Scottish expatriate sportspeople in Iran